Arizona Slim is a 1974 film directed by Richard Chase and starring Joseph Cortese and Yvonne De Carlo.

Cast 
 Joseph Cortese as Reggie
 Yvonne De Carlo as Countess Zubrovka
 Sean Walsh as Arizona Slim
 Judith Cohen as Shelley
 Michael Des Barres as Michael Pearson 		
 Pamela Des Barres as Roommate

References

External links
 

1974 films
1974 comedy films
1970s English-language films